Karmahari (also known as Qasimpur) is a village in Zamania Tehsil's Ghazipur district, Uttar Pradesh, India. Zamindar Qasim Khan established it in 1606. In 1763, most of Qasim Khan's family relocated to Daltonsganj and almost emptied the village. The family of Qasim Khan had 1542 Hectares of ancestral land, which they gave to other people and established Baraura, Karmahari, and Nonar village when they relocated to Daltonsganj. Later, some of his friends and family also relocated to Daltonsganj. The village is a part of Dewaitha Gram Panchayat.

References

Villages in Ghazipur district
Populated places established in 1606